Schaumrollen, or Schillerlocken, are an Austrian confection. They consist of a cone or tube of pastry, often filled with whipped cream or meringue. Also called foam rollers, they are a bag or roll-shaped puff pastry, which is sweetened with whipped cream or meringue, or sometimes filled with an unsweetened cream puree. The pastries are made by wrapping thin pastry strips spirally around a cone shaped sheet metal tube, which is then coated and baked. The sweet version is often rolled in coarse sugar or powdered sugar before baking.

History
This is a variety of a cream horn, which was brought to North America by Mennonites from the Austrian-Hungarian Empire.  Also popular with immigrants from the Danube region, Schaumrollen or Schillerlocken can be made up to five inches long, and are served as a treat on major holidays such as Christmas, as well as at weddings and first Communion celebrations.

Nutritional information
Like many pastries, this dessert is high in calories; an Austrian Schaumrolle is estimated to have almost 200 calories per single piece, of which 46 percent are fats, and 49 percent carbohydrates.

Name of the dessert

Schillerlocken, the alternate name for the pastry, goes back to Anton Graff's Portrait of Friedrich Schiller. The portrait shows poet Friedrich Schiller with his blond curls in relatively casual pose sitting at a table. This portrait, which is now located in Dresden in the Kügelgenhaus, was often copied and found widespread use as a copper engraving, which led to the emergence of the naming of the pastry in popular culture.

In Germany, Schillerlocken also refers to smoked dogfish belly flaps.

See also
 List of foods named after people
 List of pastries
 Cream horn
 Mille-feuille
 Sachertorte
 Torpedo dessert
 Vol-au-vent

References

External links
 Schaumrollen - Sweet meringue filled puff pastry horns

Austrian confectionery
Friedrich Schiller
Austrian pastries
Puff pastry